Below are lists of Rule 5 draft results since 1997. Players selected in the Major League Baseball (MLB) phase of the Rule 5 draft must be kept on their new team's active roster for the entire following MLB season, or they are placed on waivers and offered back to their original team if not claimed. Players chosen in the Minor League Baseball phase(s) of the Rule 5 draft remain with their new organization without restrictions.

The Rule 5 draft has happened every year since 1920. The 2021 MLB lockout led to the postponement of the major league phase of the Rule 5 draft, but the minor league phase proceeded as scheduled.

Key

Results

2022
Major league phase

Notable players chosen in the minor league phase
Wei-Chieh Huang, RHP, Pittsburgh Pirates from the San Francisco Giants
Evan Mendoza, 3B, San Diego Padres from the St. Louis Cardinals
Héctor Pérez, RHP, Tampa Bay Rays from the Baltimore Orioles
Josh Palacios, OF, Pittsburgh Pirates from the Washington Nationals
Jared Oliva, OF, Los Angeles Angels from the Pittsburgh Pirates
Nick Burdi, RHP, Chicago Cubs from the San Diego Padres
Trey McGough, LHP, Baltimore Orioles from the Pittsburgh Pirates
Logan Warmoth, SS, Seattle Mariners from the Toronto Blue Jays
Peter Solomon, RHP, Arizona Diamondbacks from the Pittsburgh Pirates
Jonathan Araúz, 2B, New York Mets from the Baltimore Orioles
Josh Stowers, OF, Los Angeles Dodgers from the Texas Rangers
Mateo Gil, SS, New York Mets from the Colorado Rockies

2021
The major league phase of the Rule 5 draft following the 2021 season was postponed due to the 2021 MLB lockout. When the lockout was resolved, the draft was cancelled.

Notable players chosen in the minor league phase
Andrew Young, 2B, Washington Nationals from the Arizona Diamondbacks
Charles Leblanc, IF, Miami Marlins from the Texas Rangers
Conner Menez, LHP, Chicago Cubs from the San Francisco Giants
Kenny Rosenberg, LHP, Los Angeles Angels from the Tampa Bay Rays
Ronnie Dawson, OF, Cincinnati Reds from the Houston Astros
John Nogowski, 1B, Atlanta Braves from the San Francisco Giants
Ben DeLuzio, OF, St. Louis Cardinals from the Arizona Diamondbacks
Cole Uvila, RHP, Baltimore Orioles from the Texas Rangers
Curtis Taylor, RHP, Washington Nationals from the Toronto Blue Jays
Brian Keller, RHP, Boston Red Sox from the New York Yankees
Carson Fulmer, RHP, Los Angeles Dodgers from the Cincinnati Reds
Jon Duplantier, RHP, Los Angeles Dodgers from the San Francisco Giants
Matt Brill, RHP, Washington Nationals from the Arizona Diamondbacks

2020
Major league phase

Notable players chosen in the minor league phase
 Shea Spitzbarth, RHP, Pittsburgh Pirates from the Los Angeles Dodgers
 Tyler Gilbert, LHP, Arizona Diamondbacks from the Los Angeles Dodgers
 Brendon Davis, IF, Los Angeles Angels from the Texas Rangers
 Jake Fishman, LHP, Miami Marlins from the Toronto Blue Jays
 Matt Krook, LHP, New York Yankees from the Tampa Bay Rays
 Nicholas Padilla, RHP Chicago Cubs from the Tampa Bay Rays
 A. J. Puckett, RHP, Atlanta Braves from the Chicago White Sox
 Zach Jackson, RHP, Oakland Athletics from the Toronto Blue Jays
 Reggie McClain, RHP, New York Yankees from the Philadelphia Phillies
 Brett Graves, RHP, Oakland Athletics from the Miami Marlins
 Drew Jackson, 2B, New York Mets from the Los Angeles Dodgers
 Jacob Pearson, OF, Atlanta Braves from the Minnesota Twins
 Yohel Pozo, C/DH, Texas Rangers from San Diego Padres
 Kaleb Ort, RHP, Boston Red Sox from the New York Yankees
 Ronnie Williams, RHP, San Francisco Giants from the St. Louis Cardinals
 Seth Martinez, RHP, Houston Astros from the Oakland Athletics

2019
Major league phase

Notable players chosen in the minor league phase
 Brian O'Keefe, C, Seattle Mariners from the St. Louis Cardinals
 Brock Stewart, RHP, Chicago Cubs from the Toronto Blue Jays
 Raynel Espinal, RHP, Boston Red Sox from the New York Yankees
 Adam Oller, RHP, New York Mets from the San Francisco Giants
 Danny Young, LHP, Cleveland Indians from the Toronto Blue Jays
 Jason Krizan, OF, Oakland Athletics from the New York Mets

2018
Major league phase

Notable players chosen in the minor league phase
Braxton Lee, OF, New York Mets from the Miami Marlins
Dusten Knight, P, Minnesota Twins from the San Francisco Giants
Ryan Thompson, P, Tampa Bay Rays from Houston Astros
Luis Lugo, LHP, Chicago Cubs from the Kansas City Royals
Corban Joseph, 2B, Oakland Athletics from the Baltimore Orioles
Sam Moll, RHP, San Francisco Giants from the Toronto Blue Jays
Mark Payton, OF, Oakland Athletics from the New York Yankees
Chris Mazza, RHP, New York Mets from the Seattle Mariners
Ian Gardeck, RHP, Tampa Bay Rays from the San Francisco Giants

2017
Major league phase

Minor league phase
Yermín Mercedes, C, Chicago White Sox from the Baltimore Orioles
Mitch Nay, 3B, Cincinnati Reds from the Toronto Blue Jays
Damien Magnifico, RHP, Pittsburgh Pirates from the Los Angeles Angels
Martin Červenka, C, Baltimore Orioles from the San Francisco Giants
Joseph Odom, C, Seattle Mariners from the Atlanta Braves
Locke St. John, LHP, Texas Rangers from the Detroit Tigers
Jacob Wilson, 2B, Washington Nationals from the St. Louis Cardinals
R. C. Orlan, RHP, Cleveland Indians from the Washington Nationals
Tyler Smith, SS, Atlanta Braves from the Texas Rangers
Iván Castillo, IF/OF, Toronto Blue Jays from the Cleveland Indians

2016
Major League phase

Minor league phase – notable players
Ty Hensley, RHP, Tampa Bay Rays from the New York Yankees
Anthony Bemboom, C, Colorado Rockies from the Los Angeles Angels
Cal Towey, OF, Miami Marlins from the Los Angeles Angels
Austin Wilson, OF, St. Louis Cardinals from the Seattle Mariners
Nick Maronde, LHP, Miami Marlins from the Cleveland Indians
Colten Brewer, RHP, New York Yankees from the Pittsburgh Pirates
Brian Moran, LHP, Baltimore Orioles from the Atlanta Braves
Alex Yarbrough, 2B, Miami Marlins from the Los Angeles Angels

2015
Major League phase

Minor league phases – notable players
 Ariel Hernandez, RHP, Cincinnati Reds from the Arizona Diamondbacks
 Enderson Franco, RHP, Atlanta Braves from the Miami Marlins
 Brian Moran, LHP Cleveland Indians from the Seattle Mariners
 Zack Cox, 3B, Washington Nationals from the Miami Marlins
 Yefry Ramírez, RHP, New York Yankees from the Arizona Diamondbacks
 David Freitas, C, Chicago Cubs from the Baltimore Orioles
 John Brebbia, RHP, St. Louis Cardinals from the Arizona Diamondbacks
 D. J. Johnson, RHP, Los Angeles Angels from the Miami Marlins

2014
Major League phase

Minor league phase – notable players
 Tim Crabbe, RHP, Arizona Diamondbacks from the Cincinnati Reds
 Greg Peavey, RHP, Minnesota Twins from the New York Mets
 Sean Halton, OF, Baltimore Orioles from the Milwaukee Brewers
 Brett Jackson, OF, San Francisco Giants from the Arizona Diamondbacks
 Randy Fontanez, RHP, Los Angeles Dodgers from the New York Mets
 Kentrail Davis, OF, Los Angeles Angels from the Milwaukee Brewers

2013
Major League phase

Minor league phase – notable players
Justin Bour, 1B, Miami Marlins from the Chicago Cubs
Evan Crawford, LHP, Chicago White Sox from the Toronto Blue Jays
Kevin Mattison, OF, Milwaukee Brewers from the Miami Marlins
Julio Borbón, OF, Baltimore Orioles from the Chicago Cubs
Russell Wilson, 2B, Texas Rangers from the Colorado Rockies
Enderson Franco, RHP, Tampa Bay Rays from the Houston Astros
Tim Atherton, RHP, Oakland Athletics from the Minnesota Twins
Omar Narváez, C, Chicago White Sox from the Tampa Bay Rays
Richard Bleier, LHP, Toronto Blue Jays from the Texas Rangers
A. J. Morris, RHP, Pittsburgh Pirates from the Chicago Cubs

2012
Major League phase

Minor league phases – notable players
Eric Farris, 2B, Seattle Mariners from the Milwaukee Brewers
Diego Goris, 3B, San Diego Padres from the Kansas City Royals
Robbie Widlansky, 1B, Los Angeles Angels from the Baltimore Orioles
Tommy Mendonca, 3B, Oakland Athletics from the Texas Rangers
Ryan Dennick, LHP, Cincinnati Reds from the Kansas City Royals
Federico Castañeda, RHP, San Diego Padres from the Kansas City Royals
Efraín Nieves, LHP, Toronto Blue Jays from the Detroit Tigers

2011
Major League phase

Minor league phase – notable players
Aaron Poreda, LHP, Pittsburgh Pirates from the San Diego Padres
Barret Browning, LHP, St. Louis Cardinals from the Los Angeles Angels
Matt Buschmann, RHP, Washington Nationals from the San Diego Padres

2010
Major League phase

Minor league phases – notable players
Dashenko Ricardo, C, San Francisco Giants from the Baltimore Orioles
Quintin Berry, OF, New York Mets from the San Diego Padres

2009
Major league phase

Minor league phase – notable players
Brian Horwitz, OF, Cleveland Indians from the San Francisco Giants

2008
Major league phase

Minor league phases – notable players

Ricardo Nanita, OF, Washington Nationals from the Chicago White Sox
Guilder Rodríguez, SS, Texas Rangers from the Milwaukee Brewers
Dave Shinskie, RHP, Toronto Blue Jays from the Minnesota Twins

2007
Major league phase

 Minor league phases – notable players
Joshua Hill, RHP, Pittsburgh Pirates from the Minnesota Twins
Levi Romero, RHP, Texas Rangers from the Houston Astros
Víctor Gárate, LHP, Los Angeles Dodgers from the Houston Astros
Juan Cedeño, LHP, Detroit Tigers from the Washington Nationals
Dustin Majewski, OF, Texas Rangers from the Toronto Blue Jays
Brett Campbell, RHP, Milwaukee Brewers from the Washington Nationals
Clayton Hamilton, RHP, Texas Rangers from the Pittsburgh Pirates
Scott Mitchinson, RHP, Oakland Athletics from the Philadelphia Phillies
Adalberto Méndez, RHP, Florida Marlins from the Chicago Cubs
Ben Fritz, RHP, Detroit Tigers from the Oakland Athletics

2006
Major league phase

 Notable players chosen in the minor league phases
 Salomón Manríquez, C, Colorado Rockies from the Washington Nationals
 Josh Labandeira, INF, Florida Marlins from the Washington Nationals
 Francisco Mateo, LHP, Cincinnati Reds from the Toronto Blue Jays
 Cristhian Martínez, RHP, Florida Marlins from the Detroit Tigers
 Brian Buscher, INF, Minnesota Twins from the San Francisco Giants

2005
Major league phase

Notable players chosen in the minor league phases
Brandon Weeden, RHP, Kansas City Royals from the Los Angeles Dodgers
Jason Bourgeois, IF, Seattle Mariners from the Atlanta Braves
Eddie Bonine, Detroit Tigers from the San Diego Padres
Eugenio Vélez, IF, San Francisco Giants from the Toronto Blue Jays
Jayce Tingler, OF, Texas Rangers from the Toronto Blue Jays
Ben Diggins, RHP, Houston Astros from the Milwaukee Brewers
Tim Hummel, IF, Chicago White Sox from the St. Louis Cardinals
Alexi Ogando, OF, Texas Rangers from the Oakland Athletics
Cole Armstrong, C, Chicago White Sox from the Atlanta Braves
Dewon Day, LHP, Chicago White Sox from the Toronto Blue Jays

2004
Major league phase

 Triple-A Phase

 Double-A Phase

2003
Major League Phase

 Triple-A Phase

 Double-A Phase

2002
Major League Phase

2001
Major League Phase

2000
Major League Phase

1999
Major League Phase

1998
Major League Phase

1997
Major League Phase

References

External links

Minor league baseball
+
Baseball in the United States lists